Musa Hilal is a Sudanese Arab tribal chief and militia leader and adviser to the Sudanese Minister of Internal Affairs. His Um Jalul clan exercised tribal leadership of the Arab Mahamid tribe in Darfur. The Mahamid are part of a larger confederation of camel-herding (Abbala) tribes of the Northern Rizeigat. Hilal is the leader of the Janjaweed militia, which was responsible for a massive military campaign against civilians in Darfur in 2003, as part of a counterinsurgency effort against Darfur rebel groups. On 21 January 2008, the Federal Government of Sudan announced the nomination of Musa Hilal as the chief advisor of the Ministry of Federal Affairs in Sudan. This position allows Mr. Hilal to coordinate with regional leaders surrounding Darfur, as well as with Arab tribal groups, on the relations of the military regime.

This political position further permits the military leader power over decisions made in Khartoum pertaining the recruitment of Janjaweed militias. In January 2014 Hilal defected from Sudan's ruling National Congress Party, and launched a new movement known as the Sudanese Awakening Revolutionary Council. As of late March 2014 Hilal was running his own administration in North Darfur, with his troops controlling Saraf Umra town, Kutum town, Kabkabiya town, and the El Waha area.

He was arrested in November 2017. By the time Sudanese President and National Congress Party leader Omar al-Bashir was deposed April 2019, it was reported that Hilal still remained in prison.

On March 11, 2021, Moussa Hilal was released, leader of the Janjaweed, the Arab militiamen accused of committing atrocities in Darfur received a pardon. Pardon granted by the Sovereign Council, the institution responsible for the transition in Sudan. Moussa Hilal remains under UN sanctions and is accused of serious crimes in Darfur.

Janjaweed

Hilal has acknowledged his role in the recruitment of Janjaweed militias, although he consistently denies that he is part of the military chain of command of the Janjaweed.  He claims to be merely an influential sheikh in the area. In his own words: "It is a lie. Janjaweed is a thief. A criminal. I am a tribal leader, with men and women and children who follow me. How can they all be thieves and bandits? It is not possible."

He also reported in an interview by Human Rights Watch on 27 September 2004: "... I am not a criminal. Thank God I’m not afraid. I’ve never had any fear. If there’s a concrete complaint and an investigation is opened against me, I can go to court -- nobody is above the law -- but not because of allegations made by Ali al Haj and Khalil Ibrahim, who are rebel leaders, who make up dark information and give to the UN, and they put my name on the list. That’s not right."

Hilal also claims that actions by the Janjaweed are organized and directed from the federal government in Khartoum under Sudanese President Omar Hassan al-Bashir. In a video interview with Human Rights Watch, Musa Hilal stated that the attacks by the militia were directly ordered by the Sudanese government, and noted that “all of the people in the field are led by top army commanders…These people get their orders from the Western command center, and from Khartoum.”

According to noted Sudan scholar Alex de Waal, "Mr. Hilal's claim that he has no control over any militia does not bear scrutiny... He is at the center of all of this." In letters to government officials and other tribal leaders, Sheikh Musa Hilal has repeatedly said his fighters are engaged in a jihad, or holy war, and will not disarm even if the government demands it. "We will not retreat," he wrote in one such letter in 2004 to the leaders in Khartoum, "we continue on the road of jihad." Trying to disarm his men, he wrote, would be "cowardly," and impossible to enforce. Another communique from Sheikh Hilal's headquarters in 2004, obtained by de Waal, demanded the militias to "change the demography of Darfur and empty it of African tribes."

Accusations
Musa Hilal has been accused of inciting ethnic conflicts in some areas in Darfur. In the 1990s, he was imprisoned on criminal charges, which included the murder of 17 people of African descent, and the robbery of the Central Bank of Nyala. In 2003 Musa Hilal was sent to prison in Port Sudan by the governor of North Darfur, but was released in April 2003 supposedly on Vice President Ali Osman Taha’s orders and given the authority to recruit and command militia forces.

After his release Musa Hilal settled in Kebkabiya, where he supposedly organized a meeting to recruit Arab tribesmen from Awlad Rashid, Ireqat and Um Jalul. He is the leader of the Um Jalul tribe, which plays a major role in the attacks in Darfur. He has been named by victims, witnesses of the attacks, and member of the armed force, as second in command of the Janjaweed militias, “border intelligence brigade,” in Misteriya.  He was reported to have met numerous times with militia leaders to coordinate other village attacks.

Musa Hilal has also been accused of kidnapping women and keeping them imprisoned in West Misteriya, at Jebel Jur Hilal. In 2006, the United Nations imposed travel and financial bans on Musa Hilal. Musa Hilal was quoted as saying, “the travel ban - that would be a humiliation. I am a tribal leader. My reputation comes above anything and everything.”

On February 27, 2008, Mr. Reeves reported the destruction of 30 villages, the assassination of 200 people, the rape of over 200 girls and women, and the kidnapping of 150 women and 200 children. These actions, Reeves argued, were executed by Janjaweed militias under direct order of militia leader, Musa Hilal.

The international pressure that has been building up over the Sudanese government to address the attacks against civilians may force the government to give up Musa Hilal to international authorities. Musa Hilal is said to hold enough information to pose a threat to the Sudanese government if the latter were to turn against him. Thus, the Sudanese government has often dismissed international criticism regarding its decision to promote Musa Hilal to adviser to Federal Affairs Minister Abdel Basit Sabderat.  Sudanese President Al Bashir was quoted as saying, “[Musa Hilal] contributed greatly to stability and security in the region.”

Influence in Chad
In December 2011 it was reported that Hilal's daughter, Amani Musa, was going to marry the president of Chad, Idriss Deby. The two were married on 21 January 2012.

See also
 Darfur Conflict

Notes and references

External links
 "In Sudan, 'a Big Sheik' Roams Free" by Emily Wax, The Washington Post, July 18, 2004
 "Darfur: Militia Leader Implicates Khartoum", Human Rights Watch, 2005
 "Darfur Notebook: Death in the Desert" by Jonathan Karl, ABC News's Nightline, 2 May 2005 (with interview notes of Hilal)
 "Janjaweed 'leader' denies genocide" BBC News's Panorama, 14 November 2004

1961 births
Living people
African warlords
People from North Darfur
People of the War in Darfur
Central African Republic Bush War
Politics of Sudan